Xanthochlorus helvinus is a species of long-legged fly in the family Dolichopodidae.

References

Xanthochlorinae
Articles created by Qbugbot
Insects described in 1861
Taxa named by Hermann Loew
Diptera of North America